John Arthur Love (November 29, 1916 – January 21, 2002) was an American attorney and Republican politician who served as the 36th Governor of the State of Colorado from 1963 to 1973.

Early life and education
John Arthur Love was born on a farm near Gibson City, Illinois, on November 29, 1916.  At age five, John Love moved with his family to Colorado Springs, Colorado.

Love received a Bachelor of Arts degree from the University of Denver in 1938 and a Bachelor of Law degree from the University of Denver School of Law in 1941.

Love served as a U.S. Navy pilot in World War II for which he was twice awarded the Distinguished Flying Cross.

Love started a law practice in Colorado Springs after the war.

Family
John Love married Ann Daniels in 1942 and the couple had three children, Dan, Andrew and Rebecca. Rebecca grew up to serve as a justice of the Colorado Supreme Court from 1995 to 2006. Andrew Love served 37 years in the US Air Force and retired in 2004 as a Major General.

Political career
In 1962, Love defeated incumbent Colorado Governor Stephen McNichols.

In 1967, Love signed the first liberalized abortion bill in the United States into law.

In 1973, John Love resigned the governorship to become the nation's first Director of the Office of Energy Policy (nicknamed the "Energy Czar") in the administration of U.S. President Richard M. Nixon. Lieutenant Governor John D. Vanderhoof assumed the office of Governor upon Governor Love's resignation. Love resigned as Director after five months due to the political turmoil in the final days of the Nixon Administration. Historian Daniel Yergin asserts Love was fired by Richard Nixon in favor of William Simon due to the energy crisis created in October 1973 by the Arab oil embargo.

Death
Love died in Colorado on January 21, 2002, at the age of 85.

See also
Energy Czar

Further reading
Lamm, Richard D. and Duane A. Smith. Pioneers and Politicians: 10 Colorado Governors in Profile. Boulder, Co.: Pruett Publishing Co., 1984.
Love, John A. Collection. 140 c.f., 1963–1973. Denver, Co.: Colorado State Archives.
Love, John A. Papers. 4 c.f., 1960–1974. Denver, Co.: Denver Public Library Western History Collection.
Love, Ann. Interview / Oral History by Jean Smith and Elaine Walsh, 1975. Denver, Co.: Colorado Historical Society.
Love, John A. Interview / Oral History by David McComb, 1974. Denver, Co.: Colorado Historical Society.
Love, John A. Interview / Oral History by Barbara Levin and Governor Richard Lamm, 1975. Denver, Co.: Colorado Historical Society.
Walker, Donald L. John A. Love: The Story of Colorado's Thirty-Sixth Governor. Denver, Co.: University of Colorado at Denver, 2000.

Notes

External links

The Governors of Colorado
The Governor John Arthur Love Collection at the Colorado State Archives
Guide to the John Love Papers at the University of Denver Retrieved 2014-09-26.

|-

|-

|-

|-

1916 births
2002 deaths
20th-century American politicians
United States Navy pilots of World War II
Colorado lawyers
Republican Party governors of Colorado
Military personnel from Colorado
Nixon administration personnel
People from Gibson City, Illinois
Politicians from Colorado Springs, Colorado
Recipients of the Distinguished Flying Cross (United States)
United States Naval Aviators
University of Denver alumni